Jagadhri is a city and a municipal council in the Yamunanagar district of the Indian state of Haryana. This town lies adjacent to the city of Yamunanagar. The demarcation line between the two is difficult to discern. Jagadhri is around 90
 km away from Chandigarh, the capital city of Haryana state. This town is known for the cluster of brass and copper industries. Jagadhri is known as the "Brass City" of India.

Etymology
Jagadhri, corrupted form of its old name Yugandhari, was  named after the king of the Yugandharas. Yugandharas find mention in Mahabharata as well as Buddhist texts as region with warriors or mountains. Yugandhara likely was used for a region  inhabited by a tribe of that name and it comprised some mountainous tracts also which were given the same name.

History
Excavations have found the punch marked square coins, a Greek hemidrachm coin of Indo-Greek king Apollodotus I or Apollodotus II (1st and 2nd century BCE ) and one of Antimachus I/Antimachus II (2nd century BCE), a gold coin  of Samudragupta (ruled 336-380 CE) and other coins of the period up to the Prithviraj Chauhan and Tomara dynasty kings of Delhi. It was likely the capital city of a Janapada.
There are few places which have signs of Ashoka like Topra kalan, Chaneti, Sugh and Lohgarh. Topra kalan is the place where the Ashoka pillar having Pali inscriptions was originally installed by Ashoka. This pillar was uprooted by Mughal invader Ferozeshah Tughlaq and was moved to Delhi and reinstalled. Chaneti has one full size Buddhist stupa excavated similar to those found in Sanchi and Sarnath. Sugh also had signs of Buddhism which have been razed by local natives. 

The town was known historically for its metal work and brass ware including utensils. Nowadays production of brass ware has fallen off, due to high costs and the city has successfully transitioned to the manufacture of aluminium and stainless steel products. Moreover, Jagadhri has also witnessed the growth of a new timber trade in the last decade.

There are many old temples, such as LathMar Mandir, Khera Mandir, Gauri Shankar Mandir and Guga Madi Mandir, Devi Mandir (Mansa Devi).

Demographics
As of 2011 Indian Census, Jagadhri had 26,716 households with a total population of 124,894 of which 67,685 were male and 57,209 were females. Population within the age group of 0 to 6 years was 14,011. The total number of literates in Jagadhri was 94,468, which constituted 75.6% of the population with male literacy of 78.3% and female literacy of 72.5%. The effective literacy rate of 7+ population of Jagadhri was 85.2%, of which male literacy rate was 88.3% and female literacy rate was 81.5%. The Scheduled Castes population was 15,460.

Surrounding places of interest

Tajewala headworks
Tajewala Barrage, completed in 1873, is where the Yamuna loses its waters to the Western and Eastern Yamuna Canals that supply water for irrigation and the Delhi waterworks. The Tajewala was replaced by the Hathnikund Barrage in 1999.

Buria
Buria is a famous town situated 8 km away from Jagadhari. It is said that Humayun came here for hunting in Shivalik forests and constructed Rang-Mahal. Many people guess the relation of 'Rang-Mahal' to Raja Birbal, one of the Navaratnas of Akbar.

Buria is also known as Buria Sahib because of a well-known Gurudwara related to Guru Teg Bahadur, ninth guru of Sikhs. An old Shiva Temple is also located in Buria. In nearby Dayalgarh, is the renovated old temple of Shree Paataaleshvar Mahadev with a garden and some ashrams of saints made during medieval times.

Bilaspur & Kapalmochan
Bilaspur town, named after the writer of the Mahabharata - Maharishi Vyasa, is a historical place. It is supposed that there was an Ashram of Ved Vyas on the bank of a pond situated here. The statue of Uma Mahadev made in 9th-10th century, and statue of Ganesha made in 11th-12th century and remains of Gupta Empire prove the antecedence of Kapalmochan. People come from all parts of the country feel spiritual elevated by taking holy bath here in ponds (kunds) known as Rinmochan, Kapalmochan and Surya kund. There is also a Hindu temple and Gurudawara of Dasham patshahi where the tenth guru of the Sikhs Guru Gobind Singh stayed. On the occasion of Guru Nanak Dev Jayanti, a huge gathering of devotees of both Sikh and Hindu origin takes place.

Panchmukhi Shri Hanuman Ji Mandir
The temple is situated on the road coming from Bilaspur to Chhachhrauli, 4 km away from Bilaspur and attracts large numbers of people. This temple has a Vigrah of Hanuman with five faces, contributing to temple's name, Panchmukhi (five faces). It is believed that wishes come true here, after the 20th day of the Diwali on the Occasion. It is believed that the five Pandavas visited  this place and prayed to Lord  Hanuman by creating  his five faces. The premises of the Temple has been greatly  renovated during the recent years and has good facilities for the devotees.

Chhachhrauli

The main tehsil situated in north east and 11 km from Jagadhri. In the past it was the capital of the Sikh state of Kalsia. Created by Raja Gurbaksh Singh in 1763. Today 'Ravi Mahal', Ghantaghar, Janak Niwas and the fort have their own dignity. There is also a Sainik Parivar Bhawan & Bal-kunj social welfare institution at Chhachrauli. It is known as "Cherapunjji of Haryana" as it receives the highest rainfall in Haryana.

Bhatouli
This village is situated north east from jagadhari- there is a main ancient temple of lord shiva.

Adi Badri

It lies 23 km north of Yamuna Nagar town. It is approachable by road via Bilaspur and is about 2 km from the nearest village Kathgarh. Located in the foothills of the Shivalik Hills, it has the Adi-Badri Narayana, Shri Kedar Nath and Mantra Devi Temples in the background. Three mounds of antiquities have recently been excavated by the Archaeological Survey of India.

Chaneti

Chaneti Buddhist Stupa is situated 3 km away from Jagadhri. It is round in shape, made of bricks, 8 meters in height, in the area of about 100 sq meters, is an old Buddhist Stupa. According to Hieun Tsang, this was built by the King Ashoka.

Harnol & Topra
Panjtirthi is situated 15 km away from Yamuna Nagar Topra Kalan to Harnol road. There are  Lord Rama, Sita, Pandavas, Shiv temples, a Gurudwara and sacred pond.

Sadhaura

It is an old historical place. It was said that people coming from Haridwar and all the religious places of Himachal Pradesh used to take rest here. It was known as the 'Sadhu-raha' in the past.

Sugh Ancient Mound

Education
Hindu girls college
Maharaja Agrasen College, Jagadhri
Maharaja Agrasen Institute of Management and Technology
S.D. Public School, Jagadhri 
Sacred Heart School, Jagadhri
Saraswati Vidya Mandir High School, Jagadhri

References

Cities and towns in Yamunanagar district
Cities and towns in Haryana